This is a timeline of the history of snooker on television in the UK.

1950s 

 1953
 27 March – The BBC shows a 30-minute programme of the final of the World Snooker Championship.
  1954
 No events.
 1955
 18 March –  The BBC shows a 30-minute programme featuring coverage of the final of the 1955 World Snooker Championship.
 1956 to 1959
 No events.

1960s
 1960 to 1968
 No events.
 1969
  23 July – Snooker tournament Pot Black launches on BBC Two. It is used as a way of showcasing colour television which had recently launched on the channel.

1970s 
 1970
 No events.
 1971
 No events.
 1972
 No events.
 1973
 21 and 28 April – The BBC covers the World Snooker Championship for the first time, albeit in very limited form with coverage limited to a semi-final (21st) and the final (28th) and is broadcast during the Saturday afternoon Grandstand programme.
 1974
 20 and 27 April – The BBC covers the 1974 World Snooker Championship. Coverage is identical to the previous year with brief coverage during Grandstand.
 1975
 No events.
 1976
 The BBC covers the 1976 World Snooker Championship and once again, coverage is broadcast during Grandstand.
 1977
 28–30 April – BBC TV coverage for the first Crucible championship increases slightly but is still limited to highlights of the semi-finals and some coverage of the final on Grandstand and in an additional late night highlights programme.
 3 December – The BBC shows coverage of the final of the first UK Championship, on BBC One's Grandstand programme. The BBC has broadcast the event ever since, gradually increasing its coverage over the years.
 1978
17-29 April – The BBC shows daily coverage of the World Snooker Championship for the first time. 14 nightly highlights programmes are shown with additional Saturday afternoon coverage on Grandstand.
 5 November – ITV shows brief highlights of the first Champion of Champions in ‘’World of Sport.
 1979
16-28 April – TV coverage of the World Championship is extended to include an early-evening "Frame of the Day" programme as well as live coverage of parts of the final.

 1980s 
 1980
17-29 April – The BBC shows daily live coverage of the World Snooker Championship for the first time.
 22–29 November – The BBC shows daily coverage of the second week of the UK Championship for the first time.
 1981
 No events.
 1982
 No events.
 1983
 No events.
 1984
 No events.
 1985
 29 April – The 1985 World Snooker Championship final between Steve Davis and Dennis Taylor attracts the largest-ever audience for a BBC Two programme, pulling in 18.5 million viewers at the climax of the match shortly after midnight.
 1986
 Following the 1986 event, Pot Black is put on hiatus as it is seen as outdated in the world of multiple events being broadcast on both the BBC and ITV.
 1987
 No events.
 1988
 ITV broadcasts all five editions of the World Matchplay tournament. ITV sees this event as being a replacement for the World Doubles Championship, which it had televised since that tournament began in 1982.
 19–27 November – The UK Championship slims down to become a nine-day event and the BBC, for the first time, shows live and recorded coverage from each day.
 1989
 No events.

 1990s 
 1990
 No events.
 1991
 2 September – After five years, Pot Black returns.
 1992
 No events.
 1993
 6 March – ITV ends its coverage of snooker after its broadcast of that year's British Open. It had previously shown around four events each year.
 20 October – Pot Blacks revival ends after three events.
 1994 No events.
 1995 No events.
 1996 No events.
 1997 No events.
 1998 No events.
 1999 ITV makes a brief return to snooker when it televises the Champions Cup and the Nations Cup.

 2000s 
 2000 No events.
 2001 19 August – ITV's return to snooker ends after it shows the 2001 Champions Cup.
 2002 No events.
 2003 Eurosport broadcasts snooker for the first time. The channel goes on to provide extensive coverage of the sport both in the UK and across Europe.
 2004 No events.2005 8 January – Premier League Snooker is relaunched with Sky Sports being the broadcaster of the event, which takes place over a four-month period. 
 29 October –  Pot Black returns as a one-day tournament and is broadcast on the BBC's Grandstand. The event features eight players.
 2006 No events.
 2007 6 October – Pot Black is held for the final time after three events as a one-day tournament.
 2008 No events.
 2009 No events.

2010s2010 October – ITV returns to the green baize when it broadcasts coverage of a new tournament called Power Snooker. The following year ITV signs a deal to show the next three events.2011 28–30 January – Sky Sports broadcasts live coverage of the first Snooker Shoot Out. Sky shows the event until 2015.2012 No events.2013 25 February-3 March – ITV makes a full return to snooker when it signs a deal to broadcast the World Open. This is the first world ranking event ITV has shown for 20 years. It only shows the event once before it moves to Eurosport.
 19–24 November – ITV expands its snooker coverage when it shows the revived Champion of Champions tournament. Coverage of broadcast on ITV4. It continues to show the tournament to this day.2014 No events.2015 No events.2016 12–14 February – The Snooker Shoot Out transfers to ITV, which shows the next three events.
 28 April– Eurosport announces that it will continue to show snooker's biggest tournaments for the next ten years with a new deal running until 2026. 
 Eurosport makes some of its snooker coverage available on free-to-air television when it begins simulcasting coverage on free-to-air channel Quest.2017 8 December – The BBC announces a multi-year extension to its coverage of snooker's ‘’Triple Crown’’ events meaning that the Masters, UK Championship and World Championship will stay on BBC screens until the end of the 2023/24 season.2018 No events.2019 21–24 February – The Shoot Out moves to Eurosport and Quest.
 19–24 March – ITV televises a new tournament - the Tour Championship. Consequently, ITV now broadcasts four top snooker tournaments each year with current deals running until 2022.

2020s
 2020 21–28 July – For the first time, Eurosport broadcasts coverage of qualifying for the World Snooker Championship.
 19 August – The BBC broadcasts the World Seniors Snooker Championship for the first time.
 13 September – FreeSports begins showing snooker when it begins its coverage of the first-ever ranking edition of the 2020 Championship League. FreeSports also covered the 2021 tournament. Earlier in the year, ITV4 launched the first sporting event after the pandemic caused a total shutdown of sporting events across the world, with this modified version of the Championship League.
 2021'''
 2 July – ITV Sport acquires the host broadcasting rights to the revived British Open. Eurosport, which had previously broadcast the tournament in the UK, will continue to show the event for European viewers outside of the UK.

References

snooker on UK television
snooker on UK television
snooker on UK television
Sports television in the United Kingdom
snooker on UK television
Snooker mass media
Snooker in the United Kingdom